The 1975 Liège–Bastogne–Liège was the 61st edition of the Liège–Bastogne–Liège cycle race and was held on 20 April 1975. The race started and finished in Liège. The race was won by Eddy Merckx of the Molteni team.

General classification

References

1975
1975 in Belgian sport
1975 Super Prestige Pernod